The Burn is a collection of short stories by the Scottish writer James Kelman first published in 1991.

References

Short story collections by James Kelman
1991 short story collections
Secker & Warburg books